Steve Rabinovitch (25 August 1942 – 11 July 1990) was a Canadian breaststroke swimmer. He competed in two events at the 1960 Summer Olympics.

References

External links
 

1942 births
1990 deaths
Canadian male breaststroke swimmers
Olympic swimmers of Canada
Swimmers at the 1960 Summer Olympics
Swimmers  from Paris
Pan American Games medalists in swimming
Pan American Games silver medalists for Canada
Swimmers at the 1959 Pan American Games
Commonwealth Games medallists in swimming
Commonwealth Games bronze medallists for Canada
Swimmers at the 1962 British Empire and Commonwealth Games
Medalists at the 1959 Pan American Games
Medallists at the 1962 British Empire and Commonwealth Games